Gaviota State Park is a state park of California, United States. One of three state parks along the Gaviota Coast, it extends from the Pacific coast to the crest of the Santa Ynez Mountains, and is adjacent to Los Padres National Forest. The  park was established in 1953.

Geography

The park is bisected by U.S. Route 101, which turns north from the coast at Gaviota, passing through the Gaviota Tunnel and Gaviota Pass, a deep canyon cut entirely through the southern branch of the Santa Ynez Mountains. Gaviota State Park consists of two units, one on each side of the highway. The western unit includes the beach and a campground, which receives most of the park's visitors.

Adjacent to the park on the west is a large region of private ranches and ranchettes known as Hollister Ranch, which extends for almost the entire distance to Point Conception (where the California coast turns to the north). Access to this portion of the coast is tightly secured, and possible only by water for non-residents.

Climate
The park is subject to a Mediterranean climate, with mild, rainy winters, and sunny summers, commonly with morning clouds. Temperatures below freezing are rare, and summertime high temperatures rise with increasing distance from the coast. Because of the topographical peculiarity of the region, a single deep canyon cut through the mountains, at certain times of year, most frequently in late spring, winds blow through the canyon with great force. These winds, known as Sundowners, are common all along the south coast of Santa Barbara County, but are frequently most violent in the Gaviota area.

Ecology
Plant communities in the park include chaparral in the upland regions, oak woodlands elsewhere, and both native prairie and non-native grasslands. They are part of the California coastal sage and chaparral ecoregion. The portion of Gaviota Creek that passes through the park includes one of the highest quality riparian habitats remaining in southern Santa Barbara County, and it receives strict environmental protection.

Much of the park vegetation was burned in a large brushfire in June 2004, with wildfire being a natural part of the chaparral ecosystem.

Mountain lions have been encountered in the park, and warning signs are prominently posted. The park was closed for a month in 1992 following a near-fatal attack by a mountain lion on a 9-year-old boy.

Facilities

Campground
The park includes a beach campground, which contains 39 campsites for RVs (up to 25 feet for most sites) and for tents.  Additionally there are eight picnic sites. The park also includes a fishing pier which includes a small boat hoist; also nearby are some favorite surfing locations. There are no hook-ups or dump station.

Trails

Both sections of the park contain trails for hiking, horseback riding, and mountain biking. The most heavily traveled trail is a short dirt road leading to a popular hot spring on the eastern side of the highway. The isolated peak has expansive views in all directions; on a clear day, much of Santa Barbara County is visible as well as the coast as far south as the Santa Monica Mountains. Trails within the park total  in all.

See also
List of beaches in California
List of California state parks

References

External links 
 Official Gaviota State Park website

State parks of California
Beaches of Southern California
Parks in Santa Barbara County, California
Protected areas established in 1953
1953 establishments in California
Santa Ynez Mountains
Beaches of Santa Barbara County, California
Beaches of Northern California